Chonqeraluy-e Pol (also Romanized as Chonqerālūy-e Pol; also known as Chonqerālū-ye Pol) is a village in Nazlu-e Shomali Rural District, Nazlu District, Urmia County, West Azerbaijan Province, Iran. At the 2006 census, its population was 1,637, in 436 families.

References 

Populated places in Urmia County